Ochanella is a genus of moths in the family Lasiocampidae from Madagascar. This is a monotypic genus: its only species is Ochanella hova.

Subspecies
Ochanella hova hova (Butler, 1882)
Ochanella hova tsaratanensis De Lajonquière, 1970

References

Lasiocampidae
Monotypic moth genera
Moths of Madagascar
Moths of Africa
Taxa named by Per Olof Christopher Aurivillius